Lương Xuân Trường (born 28 April 1995) is a Vietnamese professional footballer who plays as a central midfielder for V.League 1 club Hải Phòng and the Vietnam national team.

Xuân Trường is a product of HAGL – Arsenal JMG Academy and was promoted to Hoàng Anh Gia Lai first team in 2015, he was also given the captain arm band. Xuân Trường is praised for his vision, passing and free-kick ability.

Early life
Lương Xuân Trường was born on 28 April 1995 in Tuyên Quang in a family of two children, Lương Xuân Trường is the second child, above him is an older sister. His father Lương Bách Chiến who works in Tuyên Quang Power Company is a former amateur footballer in the army team, he's also the manager of Tuyên Quang Power Company's male football team. Xuân Trường started play football around the age of five, trained by his father. He represented Tuyên Quang Province at several youth football competitions.

Club career

Hoàng Anh Gia Lai

HAGL - Arsenal JMG Academy
In 2007, when playing for Tuyên Quang U-13 team at a youth football competition in Hanoi, Xuân Trường's team happened to be at the same hotel with HAGL – Arsenal JMG Academy's coaches who were there searching for candidates for the academy. Xuân Trường decided to take the trial and he got accepted into the academy.

In November 2012, Xuân Trường along with Nguyễn Công Phượng, Nguyễn Tuấn Anh, Trần Hữu Đông Triều were four of the players from the academy received the invitation to train with Arsenal U-17 team. In the letter, Arsenal's performance supervisor, Steve Morrow stated that coach Arsène Wenger was impressed with the academy's players when they beat Arsenal U-17 team in January.

Hoàng Anh Gia Lai first team
Xuân Trường was promoted to Hoàng Anh Gia Lai first team along with other academy's player from the first selection in 2015 when the club revolutionized their first team, most of their first team players were released, only a few was kept to guide young player from the academy. Xuân Trường was promoted to first team along with other academy's player from the first selection, he was also given the captain arm band.

Xuân Trường made his V.League 1 debut on 4 January 2015 at the opening game of the season against Sanna Khanh Hoa. He score his first league goal in this game as Hoàng Anh Gia Lai won the game 4–2. In February, Xuân Trường suffered an injury in the seventh-round game against XSKT Can Tho which kept him out for 4 months, he made his come back on June in the thirteenth-round game against Becamex Binh Duong

Incheon United
On 28 December 2015, Xuân Trường joined Incheon United on a 2 years loan deal with the alleged transfer fee of US$300,000. He became the first Vietnamese player to play in K League He made his debut game on 23 May 2016 versus Gwangju FC, he was named in the starting eleven of Incheon United, played 60 minutes and was replaced. After that Incheon United lost by 1 goal to nil.

Gangwon FC
On 21 December 2016, Xuân Trường moved from Incheon United to Gangwon FC on 1-year loan deal.

Buriram United
On 8 February 2019, Xuân Trường moved from Hoàng Anh Gia Lai to Buriram United on 1-year loan deal.
On 9 April 2019, Xuân Trường made his first assist for Buriram almost immediately after being substituted in an AFC Champions League game against Beijing Sinobo Guoan F.C. On 11 May 2019, he scored his first goal for Buriram United with a free kick in Toyota Thai League 2019  9-round match against Nakhon Ratchasima. then he joined the Vietnamese national football team

International career

Vietnam under-19
Xuân Trường was the captain of Vietnam U-19 at 2013 AFF U-19 Youth Championship, he missed out on the final due to injury as his team lost to the host Indonesia U-19 in the penalty shoot-out.

Xuân Trường represented U-19 team in all of their competitions throughout 2013 to 2014 such as: 2014 AFC U-19 Championship qualification where his team came out as Group F winner after they shockingly beat Australia U-19 (5-1), 2014 AFF U-19 Youth Championship where they finished second, and 2014 AFC U-19 Championship.

Vietnam under-23
In February 2015, Xuân Trường was called up to Vietnam U-23 training camp for 2016 AFC U-23 Championship qualification but was returned to his club later as the injury he suffered prior the training camp was much more serious than expected.

U-19

U-22

Vietnam
Scores and results list Vietnam's goal tally first.

Career statistics

International

Honours
Vietnam 
AFF Championship: 2018
VFF Cup: 2022
King's Cup: Runner-up: 2019
Vietnam U23/Olympic
AFC U-23 Championship Runners-up  2018
Asian Games: Fourth place: 2018
VFF Cup: 2018
Vietnam U19
AFF U-19 Youth Championship: Runner-up: 2013, 2014
Hassanal Bolkiah Trophy: Runner-up 2014

Individuals
  Vietnamese Silver Ball : 2016
Goal of the month Thai League : May 2019
  Most favorite players : 2016

References

External links
 
 
 Interview and Highlights
 documentary on Lương Xuân Trường
 Diary in South Korea

1995 births
Living people
Vietnamese footballers
Association football midfielders
Hoang Anh Gia Lai FC players
V.League 1 players
Incheon United FC players
K League 1 players
Vietnamese expatriate sportspeople in South Korea
Expatriate footballers in South Korea
Vietnamese expatriate footballers
Vietnam international footballers
People from Tuyên Quang province
Southeast Asian Games medalists in football
Southeast Asian Games bronze medalists for Vietnam
Footballers at the 2018 Asian Games
2019 AFC Asian Cup players
Competitors at the 2017 Southeast Asian Games
Asian Games competitors for Vietnam